Katherine Frances Brand (born 1979), known as Katy Brand, is an English actress, comedian and writer, known for her ITV2 series Katy Brand's Big Ass Show and for Comedy Lab Slap on Channel 4.

Early life and education
Brand was born in Buckinghamshire, England, in 1979, and enjoyed making people laugh with her impressions as a young child.

Brand attended St Clement Danes School in Chorleywood, Hertfordshire. Following a summer holiday at 13 with friends who were evangelical Christians she embraced their faith and attended church five times a week.

Motivated to read theology at Keble College, Oxford, she then lost her religious beliefs while a student. Interviewed for the Evening Standard in 2007, she commented: "After about a year, I realised it was mostly rubbish and that things are never as simple as they seem when you are 13".

While at Oxford, she started to write and perform comedy, musicals and serious plays, joining the Oxford Revue and the university's dramatic society.

Brand won Celebrity Mastermind in an edition broadcast in May 2021.

Career
After graduation, Brand did not work as a performer, gaining employment in television production for five years instead, but her social encounters with university contemporaries ultimately convinced her to try working as a comedian. In 2004 she wrote a comedy monologue, performing it around a few pubs in London before joining Ealing Live, a weekly live spot.

Brand established her name with her solo stand-up act at the Edinburgh Fringe in 2005.

In 2008, she collaborated with Katherine Parkinson, one of her friends from university, on a BBC Radio 4 series called Mouth Trap.

Brand performed in Katy Brand's Big Ass Tour 2010. She also competed on Let's Dance for Sport Relief in 2010, in which she danced to Beyoncé's "Single Ladies (Put a Ring on It)". Also in 2010, she made a guest appearance on the song "Stop Giving Me Verses" by The Hoosiers, which was an attempt to break the world record for the longest single ever released.

In 2011, Brand took part in the BBC Learning project "Off By Heart Shakespeare", where she played the role of Titania from A Midsummer Night’s Dream and delivered a performance of the speech "Out of this wood do not desire to go".

In 2011 she guest-hosted a Children in Need special episode of Never Mind the Buzzcocks, and has participated in several other episodes of the show. In December 2012 she participated in  the 2012 Christmas Special of the dance show, Strictly Come Dancing. Her partner was Anton du Beke; they came second to last.

Brand presented the Penguin Podcast for Penguin Books until February 2021, which included interviews with authors such as Michael Morpurgo (War Horse), Markus Zusak (The Book Thief) and Gabourey Sidibe.

She published her debut novel Brenda Monk is Funny in 2014, a story about a woman trying to establish a career as a comedian. Her debut play 3Women starring Anita Dobson opened at Trafalgar Studios 2 in May 2018 and is published by Samuel French. Her latest book I Carried a Watermelon was published by HarperCollins Publishers in October 2019.

In March 2020, she took the role of Miss Hedge in the West End musical Everybody's Talking About Jamie.

, the comedy feature film Good Luck to You, Leo Grande, scripted by Brand, starring Emma Thompson and directed by Sophie Hyde, is in the pre-production stage. It has since been completed and aired on Hulu.

Awards
In 2008 she won "Best Female Newcomer" in the 2008 British Comedy Awards. and was also nominated for a Royal Television Society Award the same year.

For Good Luck to You, Leo Grande, Brand was nominated for two British Independent Film Awards: Best Independent Film and Best Screenplay.

Filmography

References

External links
Official Katy Brand Website

1979 births
Living people
Alumni of Keble College, Oxford
English film actresses
English impressionists (entertainers)
English radio actresses
English television actresses
English television writers
English voice actresses
English women comedians
People educated at St. Clement Danes School
British women screenwriters
British women television writers